is a Japanese series written and illustrated by Seiji Hayashi. It was serialized in Shueisha's shōnen manga magazine Weekly Shōnen Jump from September 2018 to May 2019 and in Saikyō Jump from June 2019 to April 2020. Its chapters were collected in six tankōbon volumes. Viz Media published the first three chapters for its "Jump Start" initiative. Shueisha simulpublished the series in English on their app and website platform Manga Plus in January 2019. A 50-episode anime television series adaptation by ODDJOB was broadcast on TV Tokyo from April 2019 to March 2020.

Characters

Media

Manga
I'm from Japan is written and illustrated by Seiji Hayashi. It was serialized in Shueisha's Weekly Shōnen Jump magazine from September 15, 2018 to May 27, 2019.<ref></p></ref><ref name="saikyo-ANN"></p></ref> It was then transferred to Saikyō Jump, where it ran from June 1, 2019 to April 2, 2020. The individual chapters were collected and published by Shueisha into six tankōbon volumes, released from January 4, 2019 to May 13, 2020.

Viz Media published the first three chapters for its "Jump Start" initiative. Shueisha simulpublished the series in English on their app and website Manga Plus.

Volume list

Anime
An anime television series adaptation was announced via Weekly Shōnen Jump's official Twitter account on December 22, 2018. The series is animated by ODDJOB and directed by Isamu Ueno, with Masato Naruse and Kōji Hashimoto handling series composition, and Hana Nohara and Fumiyuki Uehara designing the characters. The series premiered on TV Tokyo on April 8, 2019 and finished on March 23, 2020. Akira Kushida performed the series' ending theme song "Appare! Jimoto ga Ichiban!!".

Notes

References

External links
  
  
 

2019 anime television series debuts
Anime series based on manga
Comedy anime and manga
Martial arts anime and manga
Shōnen manga
Shueisha manga
TV Tokyo original programming
Viz Media manga